The Bay of Saint-Augustin is located on the southwestern coast of Madagascar in the region of Atsimo-Andrefana at the Mozambique Channel. This bay is the mouth of the Onilahy River at a distance of 35 kilometres south of Toliara.

Saint-Augustin, Bay of
Atsimo-Andrefana
Pirate dens and locations